Ordo Iuris (full official name: Ordo Iuris Institute for Legal Culture) is an ultra-conservative Polish Catholic legal organization and think tank. It aims to "research the legal culture and spiritual heritage in which Polish culture is rooted, and to promote them in public life and the legal system". From 2016, the organisation became known for its anti-LGBT, anti-abortion and anti-divorce activism.

History 

The first high-profile initiative of Ordo luris was an attempt to draft an anti-abortion bill in 2016, which aimed to its full prohibition and introduce criminal liability for anyone who causes the death of a conceived child, including its mother. However, it caused the Black Protests across the country and was eventually rejected by Sejm voting on October 6, 2016. During the discussion prior to the vote, Joanna Banasiuk of Ordo Iuris presented a "self-amendment" with the aim of removing the so-called criminal record of mothers.

In 2021, it helped to inaugurate the Collegium Intermarium a private university.

Among the supporters of Ordo Iuris are high-ranking Polish national politicians, such as the current minister of education, Przemysław Czarnek (PiS).

References

External links 

Official website

2013 establishments in Poland
Catholicism and far-right politics
Conservatism in Poland
Organizations established in 2013
Organizations that oppose LGBT rights
Think tanks based in Poland
Legal organizations based in Poland
Anti-LGBT and Catholicism
LGBT in Poland
Tradition, Family, Property